Georgi Pirinski (born 10 September 1948) is a Bulgarian politician of the Bulgarian Communist Party and after 1990 of the Bulgarian Socialist Party (BSP). He was a member of seven National Parliaments (1994 – 1997) and was the Chairman of the National Assembly of Bulgaria from 2005 to 2009. Member of the European Parliament between 2014 and 2019.

Biography
Born in New York City, U.S. in the emigrant family of Communist functionary Georgi Pirinski Sr., he has roots from Pirin Macedonia. His mother Pauline was born in New York City and was a member of the Young Communist League at the City College of New York. She was a professor of English at Sofia University. His father found refuge in the U.S. after he participated in the unsuccessful Communist uprising against the Bulgarian ruling monarchy in 1923 and was expelled from the U.S. as an undesirable alien in 1951. While a convinced communist, Pirinski did show some flashes of independent thinking, such as expressing disagreement in a private conversation with foreign visitors in 1970 at the decision of Bulgarian media to downplay the U.S. moonwalk the previous year. In the late 1970s, Pirinski was an aide to then Deputy Prime Minister Andrey Lukanov and then at the age of 31 became Bulgaria's youngest deputy minister (of foreign trade). He renounced his U.S. citizenship in 1974, but political opponents later argued that the renunciation was judicially null. Pirinski was considered the BSP's favorite for the 1996 presidential nomination until the Constitutional Court barred him from participating in the presidential elections for failing to satisfy a constitutional requirement that the president be a Bulgarian citizen by birth (he was a U.S. citizen by birth).

A vice-premier during the Georgi Atanasov and Andrey Lukanov governments and a foreign minister during the Zhan Videnov government, Pirinski was the Chairman of the National Assembly of Bulgaria from 11 July 2005 to 25 June 2009.

See also

List of foreign ministers in 1997 
 Foreign relations of Bulgaria
List of Bulgarians

References

Ташев, Ташо (1999). Министрите на България 1879-1999. София: АИ "Проф. Марин Дринов" / Изд. на МО.  / .  (In English: Ministers of Bulgaria 1879-1999; Tasho Tashev, Sofia)

External links

Info on Pirinski on the National assembly website

 

1948 births
Living people
Chairpersons of the National Assembly of Bulgaria
Politicians from New York City
Bulgarian people of American descent
Former United States citizens
Macedonian Bulgarians
University of National and World Economy alumni
Bulgarian Communist Party politicians
Members of the National Assembly (Bulgaria)
Deputy prime ministers of Bulgaria
Foreign ministers of Bulgaria
MEPs for Bulgaria 2014–2019
Bulgarian Socialist Party politicians
Karl Marx Higher Institute of Economics alumni
American emigrants to Bulgaria